P. T. Thomas (12 December 1950 – 22 December 2021) was an Indian politician who served as a member of the Kerala Legislative Assembly, represented Thrikkakkara assembly constituency from 2016 until his death in 2021. He was also a Member of Parliament who represented the Idukki Lok Sabha constituency in Kerala, India. He belonged to Indian National Congress.

He was elected to Kerala Legislative Assembly from Thrikkakkara assembly constituency in 2016 Kerala Legislative Assembly election by defeating Sebastian Paul of Communist Party of India (Marxist) by a margin of 11996 votes.

Thomas died from cancer on 22 December 2021, at the age of 71.

Positions held
 2016 – 22 December 2021 - MLA, Kerala Legislative Assembly, Thrikkakkara assembly constituency
 1991–1996, 2001–2006  – MLA, Kerala Legislative Assembly , Thodupuzha assembly constituency
 2009–2014 – Member of Parliament, Lok Sabha, Idukki Lok Sabha Constituency
 2009 – Member, Committee on Personnel, Public Grievances, Law and Justice Lok Sabha
 2007 – President, District Congress Committee
 1990 – Member, Idukki District Council
 1980 – Member, Kerala Pradesh Congress Committee
Working President, Kerala Pradesh Congress Committee

Literary Works
 ADByum Prathyasasthra Shadyangalum – An analysis on the issues related to the taking of ADB loan

References

External links 
 Lok Sabha's member profile 

1950 births
2021 deaths
Indian National Congress politicians from Kerala
India MPs 2009–2014
Lok Sabha members from Kerala
People from Idukki district
Kerala MLAs 2016–2021
Deaths from cancer in India